Ulf Söderman (born 18 March 1963) is a Swedish former athlete who competed in the sprint hurdles. He represented his country at one outdoor and two indoor World Championships.

His personal bests are 13.78 seconds in the 110 metres hurdles (+1.3 m/s; Duisburg 1989) and 7.80 seconds in the 60 metres hurdles (Oslo 1987).

International competitions

References

1963 births
Living people
Swedish male hurdlers
World Athletics Championships athletes for Sweden